At least two ships of the French Navy have been named Lansquenet:

 , a  launched in 1909 and struck in 1928
 , a  launched in 1939 and scuttled in 1942

French Navy ship names